The Corps of the Port Captaincies – Coast Guard is the coast guard of Italy and is part of the Italian Navy under the control of the Ministry of Infrastructure and Transport. Its head office is in Rome.

Missions
The missions of the Italian Coast Guard include:
 Search and rescue
 Maritime law enforcement
 Protection of marine resources
 Safety of navigation
 Fisheries protection and regulation

History

Structure and organization

Structure
The Corps of the Port Captaincies – Coast Guard is structured as follows:
 1 MARICOGECAP – Port Captaincies General Headquarters – , which functions of Italian Maritime Rescue Co-ordination Centre (IMRCC) 
 15 DIREZIOMARE – Maritime Directorates – , which are at the head of as many Maritime Rescue Sub-Centre Commands (MRSC)
 55 COMPAMARE – Maritime Departments / Port Captaincies –  
 51 CIRCOMARE – Maritime District Offices –  
 126 LOCAMARE – Local Maritime Offices – 
 61 DELEMARE – Maritime Delegations or Beach Delegations –  or 

Moreover, the following services are also part of the Corps:
 the air-sea component;
 the Cospas-Sarsat satellite station of Bari (in synergy with the Civil Protection Department);
 the five Underwater Operators Groups (San Benedetto del Tronto, Naples, Messina, Cagliari and Genoa);
 the two Nautical Teams (Lake Garda – Salò; Lake Maggiore – Verbania)
 the Marine Environmental Division of the Port Captaincies by the Ministry for the Environment and Protection of the Territory;
 the group by the General Fishery Direction of the Ministry of Agriculture.

The coast guard also has an air wing.

Tasks

The principal tasks of the Corps activities are the following:
Search and rescue at sea (SAR) with the entire organization of co-ordination, control, detection and communications active for 24 hours a day requested by this activity;
Safety of navigation, with systematic investigative controls on the entire national mercantile, fishing and pleasure shipping, through the activity of Port State Control, also on the foreign mercantile shipping that calling at the national ports;
Peripheral administration of State functions in the matters of formation of the maritime personnel, of registration of the mercantile and fishing shipping, of pleasure shipping, and of the contentious for those maritime crimes that have been de-penalized;
Maritime police (namely technical-administrative maritime police), including the discipline of maritime navigation and the regulation of the events that are carried out in the maritime areas that fall under the national sovereignty, the control of the maritime traffic, the manoeuvre of the ships and the safety in the ports, inquiries on the maritime accidents, the control on the maritime State property, the testing and periodic inspections of coastal deposits and other hazardous installations.

Other functions are carried out for the Ministries of defence (enrollment of the military personnel), for Cultural Activities and Treasures (underwater archaeology), of internal affairs (anti-illegal immigration), of Justice and the department of civil protection, all having as a common denominator the sea and navigation. The broadness and the variety of activities carried out present the Corps of the Port Captaincies – Coast Guard as an organism of reference for the maritime activities and make of them a true "sole counter" for the relations with the seafarers. The Corps is represented in a highly specialized structure, as well under the administrative profile as under the technical-operational one, for the completing of the Public functions that are carried out in the maritime spaces of national interest. These spaces include 155 000 km² of maritime waters, internal and territorial, which are in every respect part of the national territory, and other 350 000 km² of waters on which Italy has exclusive rights (exploitation of the depths resources) or duties (rescue in sea and safeguard of the marine environment): a number of marine areas whose extension is almost the double of the entire national territory, which as it is known amounts to 301 000 km². Following the tendency that is affirming itself in Europe, the maritime authority – coast guard must exercise an effective control in sea for the safeguard of human life, for the safety of navigation, for the correct going on of the economic activities (fishing and exploitation of the continental platform) and for the protection of the marine environment.

The Italian Marine Casualty Investigation Central Board (MCICB , CCISM), a division of the Corps, investigates maritime accidents and incidents. It is not an independent maritime accident investigation unit.

Insignia
Like related coast guards around the world, the  uses a "racing stripe" on its vessels. This marking is in the national colors, with a narrow green band, a narrow white spacing, and a broad red band. Inside the red band is a white circle with a black anchor.

Rank insignia

See also
Italian Coast Guard Air Service
List of Italian Coast Guard vessels

References

External links

Guardia Costiera homepage 

 
Military units and formations established in 1865
1865 establishments in Italy
Rome Q. XXXII Europa